Chauvin is a surname. Notable people with the surname include:

 Derek Chauvin (born 1976), American police officer who was convicted of murdering George Floyd
 Étienne Chauvin (1640–1725), French Protestant divine
 Frank Chauvin (c. 1933–2015), Canadian charity worker
 Ingrid Chauvin (born 1973), French actress
 Jean Chauvin (1509–1564), French theologian, pastor and reformer 
 Jeanne Chauvin (1862–1926), French lawyer
 Julien Chauvin (born 1979), French violinist
 Landry Chauvin (born 1968), French former footballer 
 Léon Adolphe Chauvin (1861–1904), Canadian lawyer 
 Lilyan Chauvin (1925–2008), French-American actress
 Louis Chauvin (1881–1908), American ragtime composer
 Madame Vignon-Chauvin (19th century), French fashion designer 
 Marcel Chauvin (born 1914), French clergyman and auxiliary bishop
 Nicolas Chauvin, a mythical patriot said to have served during Napoleon Bonaparte's reign; origin of the term chauvinism
 Nicolas Chauvin de La Frénière (died 1769), son of Nicolas Chauvin
 Pierre de Chauvin de Tonnetuit (died 1603), French naval and military captain and a lieutenant of New France
 Pierre-Athanase Chauvin (1774–1832), French painter active in Italy
 Remy Chauvin (1913–2009), French biologist
 Victor Chauvin (1844–1913), Arabic and Hebrew professor 
 Yves Chauvin (1930–2015), French chemist

French-language surnames